Aleksandr Valeryevich Shishkin (born 13 October 1966) is a former Russian football player.

References

1966 births
Living people
Soviet footballers
FC Tyumen players
FC Asmaral Moscow players
Russian footballers
Russian Premier League players
Association football goalkeepers
FC Spartak Moscow players